Skelmuir Hill is a landform in Aberdeenshire, Scotland. This is the location of a trig point or official government survey marker. Skelmuir Hill is the site of some ancient standing stones; it is in the vicinity of another ancient monument, Catto Long Barrow.

See also
 Laeca Burn

Line notes

References
 Geograph British Isles (2008) 
 C. Michael Hogan (2008) Catto Long Barrow fieldnotes, The Modern Antiquarian

Mountains and hills of Aberdeenshire